Juan Espinosa may refer to:

 Juan de Espinosa, Spanish Baroque painter
 Juan Espinosa (politician), Nicaraguan politician
 Juan Pablo Espinosa, Colombian actor
 Juan Javier Espinosa, president of Ecuador
 Juan Espinosa (field hockey), see

See also
 Juan Espinoza (disambiguation)